In August 2019 President of Sri Lanka Maithripala Sirisena awarded national honours to 70 individuals for distinguished services. The awards ceremony was held on 19 August 2019 at the Bandaranaike Memorial International Conference Hall in Colombo.

Deshamanya
 Indrajit Coomaraswamy
 Ajita de Zoysa
 Merrill Joseph Fernando
 Mohan Munasinghe
 Moragodage Christopher Walter Pinto
 Surath Wickramasinghe

Deshabandu
 Edwin Ariyadasa
 Jayasuriya Mudiyanselage Raja Sarath Bandara
 Dissanayake Mudiyanselage Sri Shanthi Lakshman Dissanayake
 Wimal Dissanayake
 Muthukuda Arrachchige Dona Shiroma Jeeva
 Mohomed Ruwaiz Latiff
 Anselm Boniface Perera
 Nimal Ebenezer Herat Sanderatne
 Anura Tennekoon
 Robosingha Arachchige Sugath Thilakarathne

Vidya Jyothi
 Arjuna de Silva
 Hithanadura Asita de Silva
 Vajira Harshadeva Weerabaddana Dissanayake
 Prasad Katulanda
 Serosha Mandika Wijeyaratne
 Nambunama Nanayakkara Akmeemana Palliyaguruge Bandula Chandranath Wijesiriwardena

Kala Keerthi
 Mahagam Arachchige Jayantha Chandrasiri
 Jerome Lakshman de Silva
 Sathischandra Edirisinghe
 Haputantrige Leelaratne Leel Gunasekera
 Hetti Arachchige Karunaratne
 Ranaweera Arachchilage Ariyawansa Ranaweera
 Navaratna Ravibandhu Vidyapathy
 Anoja Weerasinghe
 Rathna Sri Wijesinghe

Sri Lanka Sikhamani
 Anil Abeywickrama
 Tara de Mel
 Lloyd Fernando
 Jammagalage Dian Gomes
 Wimal Karandagoda
 Lakshman Ravendra Watawala
 Dinesh Stephen Weerakkody
 Anula Wijesundera

Vidya Nidhi
 Joel Arudchelvam
 Mangala Gunatilake
 Mohamed Sakkaff Mohamed Rizny

Kala Suri
 Panditha Mudiyanselage Karunarathna Bandara
 Sumana Aloka Bandara
 Mahinda Chandrasekara
 Prangige Ananda Kithsiri Dabare
 Kiribanda Mahinda Dissanayake
 Eric Illayapparachchi
 Mahamaddumage Hemapriya Kalanie Perera
 Palitha Perera
 Kathiresu Rathitharan
 Wijerathna Samarasekara Indika Upamali
 Wijesinghe Arachchillage Karunasiri Wijesinghe

Sri Lanka Thilaka
 Singharage Sarath Chandra de Silva
 Wannakuwattewaduge Dinesh Nishantha Fernando
 Ponnambalam Jamunadevi
 Mahindadasa Wickramanayaka Karunaratne
 Samantha Sathischandra Wanniarachchi Kumarasinghe
 Jayanthi Kuru-Utumpala
 Mahinda Madihahewa
 Pera Dorapege Lalitha Padmini
 Thambiah Perinpanayagam
 Meyan Vamadevan
 Weliwita Liyana Arachchillage Premasiri Weliwita

Veera Prathapa
 Heeralu Mohottalalage Keerthi Bandara Padmasiri
 Moradeniyalage Eranga Vikumsiri

Sri Lanka Rathna
 Yasushi Akashi

Sri Lanka Ranajana
 S. Arulkumaran
 Cumaraswamy Sivathasan
 David Alexander Young

References
 

Sri Lanka National Honours
National Honours
Civil awards and decorations of Sri Lanka